Nurul Abedin Nobel (born 7 September 1964) is a former Bangladeshi cricketer, who played in four One Day Internationals from 1986 to 1990.

Nurul Abedin was the elder brother of Minhajul Abedin (Nannu). Originally from Chittagong, the brothers were prominent figures in Dhaka cricket, in the 80's and 90's. In the international arena, Nobel was in and out of the national side. Though no less gifted than his brother, he had to suffer for the whims of the selectors. Still, he opened the innings in Bangladesh's very first ODI against Pakistan in 86. A week before the tournament, he had scored a memorable 102 against Pakistan Zone A. There, he had put on 135 for the second wicket with the skipper Gazi Ashraf Hossain. Against a stronger zone C side, he had scored 50, sharing a century opening stand with the veteran Raqibul Hasan.

His best performance came in the 1990 ICC Trophy in Netherlands. His 85 against Denmark and 105 against Canada helped Bangladesh reach the Semi-Finals. Overall, in 5 matches he scored a total of 235 runs at an average of 47.00.

References

External links 
 

1964 births
Bangladesh One Day International cricketers
Bangladeshi cricketers
Living people
People from Chittagong